Gassantoda Castle (月山富田城, Gassantoda-jō) was a Japanese castle located in Yasugi, Shimane Prefecture.

History

It is believed the castle was built in the Heian period but this is unclear. Later the castle served as the seat of the powerful Amago clan. It was a mountain castle (yamashiro) regarded as the most impregnable castle in all of Japan, and for the next two centuries was considered the most important castle in the San'in region. Gassantoda Castle was besieged by the Ōuchi clan and Mōri clan in the Siege of Toda Castle, but the Amago managed to repel them. In 1566, after several failed assaults and a prolonged siege, the castle fell to Mōri Motonari, ending the Amago clan as a force in the region. This victory confirmed Motonari's rise to the position of most powerful warlord in Western Japan, and the castle would become one of several castles in the region occupied by the Mōri. In 1600, ownership of the castle was passed to Horio Tadauji for supporting Tokugawa Ieyasu in the Battle of Sekigahara. Tadauji died in 1604 and his father Horio Yoshiharu, serving as the regent of his son and successor Horio Tadaharu, commissioned the construction of Matsue Castle in 1607. Yoshiharu relocated the seat of the Matsue Domain to the new castle upon its completion in 1611, and Gassantoda Castle was subsequently abandoned and demolished. Today, only ruins of the castle still stand in the modern city of Yasugi.

Gassantoda Castle is regarded as among Japan's Five Greatest Mountain Castles, along with Kasugayama Castle, Nanao Castle, Kannonji Castle and Odani Castle. Today it is one of Japan's nationally designated historical ruins.

Gallery

Further reading

References

External links
Japanese Castle Explorer - Gassan Toda Castle
戦国の覇者・尼子盛衰記をめぐる page at official site of city of Yasugi

Castles in Shimane Prefecture
Historic Sites of Japan
Amago clan
Mōri clan
1390s establishments in Japan